Pelayos de la Presa is a municipality in the Community of Madrid, Spain. It covers an area of 7.58 km2. , it has a population of 2,475.

It is located in the southwest of the region, near the San Juan Reservoir (retaining the waters of the Alberche), the source the municipal water supplies come from. The reservoir is shared between Pelayos de la Presa, Navas del Rey and San Martín de Valdeiglesias, with Pelayos de la Presa having jurisdiction over "El Muro" area. As it is the only reservoir in the region declared as swimming area, it attracts tourism.
The , with its origins dating back to the 12th century, cistercian-style, is located in the municipality. It is located at 570 m over sea level.

References

Municipalities in the Community of Madrid